is a Japanese footballer currently playing as a defensive midfielder for Shimizu S-Pulse of the J2 League.

Career statistics

Club

Notes

References

External links

Profile at Shimizu S-Pulse

2001 births
Living people
Japanese footballers
Japan youth international footballers
Association football midfielders
J1 League players
Sagan Tosu players
Shimizu S-Pulse players